Alfred Reynolds (1884–1969) was a composer of light music for the theatre.

He was born in Liverpool and educated at Merchant Taylors' School and later in France. He studied with Engelbert Humperdinck in Berlin.

In 1910, he conducted Oscar Straus's The Chocolate Soldier, which he toured in England.  He was said to be the youngest operatic conductor in England.  He composed for and participated in wartime charity concerts.  In 1920-21, Reynolds toured the Far East with the Royal Opera.  On his return he wrote the music for Baroness Orczy's play, Leatherface.  Reynolds worked on the revival of 18th century ballad operas.

In 1923 he became Musical Director of the Lyric Theatre, Hammersmith, where he performed revivals of  Sheridan's The Duenna (1924), Lionel And Clarissa (1925), with music mainly by Charles Dibdin, and Love in a Village (1928), with music by Thomas Arne.  He wrote incidental music for several plays, including those by Molière, Farquhar, Shakespeare and Goldsmith, and review music for Nigel Playfair. The Lyric staged Reynolds's comic operas The Fountain of Youth and Derby Day.

Reynolds left the Lyric in 1932 for the Birmingham Repertory Theatre.  He wrote 1066 And All That (a musical based on the comic book by of that name) and a score for The Swiss Family Robinson.

In 1947, he wrote music for a Stratford-upon-Avon adaptation of Alice in Wonderland and Through the Looking-Glass.  A two-act comic opera, The Limpet in the Castle, was premiered in 1958 at Wombwell, Yorkshire.

Much of his theatre music has been played in the concert hall.

Reynolds died aged 84 at Bognor Regis on 18 October 1969.

References

Philip L. Scowcroft, Theatre Conductor and Composer: Alfred Reynolds (1884-1969)

English musical theatre composers
English male composers
1969 deaths
1884 births
20th-century British male musicians
20th-century British musicians
People educated at Merchant Taylors' Boys' School, Crosby